Nebria wutaishanensis is a species of ground beetle in the Nebriinae subfamily that is endemic to Shanxi, China.

References

wutaishanensis
Beetles described in 1983
Beetles of Asia
Endemic fauna of China